Dehra Temple is a monument protected by Haryana State at Bhond village. The temple is on National Highway 248(India), 2 km west of Ferozepur Jhirka on the foothills on the west side of Nuh District, in Haryana.

About deity 

The Jain temple was possibly constructed in 1451 CE (Samvat 1508) as can be inferred from an inscription fixed on the upper portion of the entrance of the pillared hall (Sabhamandapa) of the temple. This temple consists of three sanctumsanctorums for the three Jain Tirthankars; a pillared hall and a circumambulatory path (Pradakshinapath). The temple architecture appears to be heavily influenced by then prevailing Lodhi style of architecture.

The temple had the deity image of Thirthankra. Later it was removed and placed it in the Jaina Temple at Firozpur Jhirka.

See also
List of State Protected Monuments in Haryana

References

External links 
 
 

Hindu temples in Haryana